Judith Catherine Buxton (born 7 October 1949) is an English actress best known for playing Nurse Katy Shaw in General Hospital (1972–1973), Susan Protheroe in By the Sword Divided (1983–1985) and Ruth Carpenter in On the Up (1990–1992). She has also appeared in several films including Aces High (1976) and The Big Sleep (1978) as well as having an extensive stage career with the Royal Shakespeare Company.

Early life
Born in Croydon, Surrey, Buxton attended Croydon High School and graduated from the Rose Bruford College.

Career
Making her screen debut in an episode of Dixon of Dock Green in 1972, Buxton then went on to have a regular role in the television series General Hospital playing nurse Katy Shaw in twenty six episodes. After this, Buxton had roles in several popular television series such as The Sweeney, Public Eye and Get Some In!, before appearing in two episodes of Rising Damp as Caroline Armitage and played Inga, Roj Blake's cousin in Blake's 7. Buxton made her film debut in the horror film I Don't Want to Be Born with Joan Collins in 1975 before she appeared in the comedy films The Likely Lads and The Bawdy Adventures of Tom Jones (both 1976). After starring in high-profile films such as Aces High (1976) and The Big Sleep (1978), Buxton joined the Royal Shakespeare Company in 1979, where she played principal roles until 1982. Her “memorable...and exceptional” performance of Iphigenia in The Greeks and Juliet in Romeo and Juliet were particularly notable. Time magazine critic T.E. Kalem wrote of her “unforgettable” portrayal of Iphigenia: “...as Buxton reaches the heartbreaking conclusion that the one life she has to give for Hellas is the noblest life to have lived, she radiates a great and unforgettable purity of spirit.”

Returning to television in 1983, Buxton played the main role of Susan Protheroe in By The Sword Divided until the show's end in 1985 before having roles in Bergerac and Lovejoy and playing Ruth Carpenter, a main role, in the television comedy On the Up from 1990 to 1992 alongside Dennis Waterman and Joan Sims. In the late 1980s, Buxton went onto narrate a few My Little Pony book and tape sets from Tempo Talking Stories. In 1998, Buxton had a role in the romantic comedy film Get Real. In 2006 she was in the cast of a well-received UK touring production of Noël Coward's Star Quality.

Personal life
Buxton is married to Jeffrey Holland, best known as Spike in Hi-de-Hi!.

Filmography

Film

Television

Theatre
1973: Boeing-Boeing - Jacqueline
1973: The French Mistress - Madaleine Lafarge
1974: Tartuffe - Marianne
1975: The Mating Game - Secretary
1975: Relatively Speaking - Ginny
1976: Baggage - Leila
1976: The Ghost Train - Peggy Murdock
1976: The Constant Wife - Marie Louise
1977: A Man for All Seasons - Margaret
1978: Dear Brutus - Joanna Trout
1978: A Murder Is Announced - Julia Simmons
1979: Habeas Corpus - Felicity Rumpers
1979: On Approval - Helen Hale
1980: Iphigenia in Aulis - Iphigenia
1980: La Ronde - Sweet Girl
1981: Romeo and Juliet - Juliet (with the Royal Shakespeare Company)
1981: The Merchant of Venice - Jessica (with the Royal Shakespeare Company)
1981: Timon of Athens - Phrynia (with the Royal Shakespeare Company)
1982: The Swan Down Gloves - Kit the Glovemaker (with the Royal Shakespeare Company)
1983: The School for Scandal - Lady Teazle
1987: The Lover - Sarah
1987: The Prisoner of Zenda - Princess Flavia
1989: Dangerous Corner - Freda Caplan
1989: Last of the Red Hot Lovers - Elaine Navazio
1990: Run for Your Wife - Mary Smith
1990: Whose Wife Is It Anyway? - Jane Worthington
1991: The Drummer - The Lady
1992: The Earl and the Pussycat - Emily Thornton
1993: Jeffrey Bernard Is Unwell - Various
1995: The Constant Wife - Marie Louise
1995: Out of Order - Jane Worthington
1996: Private Lives - Amanda
1997: Funny Money - Jean Perkins
1999: Run for Your Wife - Mary Smith
2001: Funny Money - Jean Perkins
2001: Run for Your Wife - Mary Smith
2002: Wife Begins at Forty - Linda Harper
2002: Snakes and Ladders - Faye Spence
2003: It Runs in the Family - Rosemary Mortimore
2003: Wife Begins at Forty - Linda Harper
2004: There Goes the Bride - Ursula
2004: Murder by Misadventure - Emma
2004: Confusions - Various
2004: Relatively Speaking - Sheila
2005: Caught in the Net - Mary Smith
2006: Star Quality - Marion Blake
2007: The Secretary Bird - Liz Walford
2008: Come On, Jeeves - Lady Monica Carmoyle
2009: 'Allo 'Allo! - Michelle Dubois
2010: It's Never Too Late - Linda Bridges
2010: Spring and Port Wine - Daisy Crompton
2011: Cranford - Lady Glenmire
2011: Changing Rooms - Jacqueline
2011: The Art of Concealment: The Life of Terence Rattigan - Vera Rattigan/Aunt Edna
2012: The Art of Concealment: The Life of Terence Rattigan - Vera Rattigan/Aunt Edna
2013: Lady Windermere's Fan - Mrs. Erlynne
2014: Double Death - Lalla Kershaw
2015: Blast from the Past - Julie Tate
2015: The Ghost Train - Miss Bourne
2016: Secondary Cause of Death - Cynthia Maple
2016: Blithe Spirit - Madame Arcati
2016: Blast from the Past - Julie Tate
2017: Trespass - Mrs. Henting
2018: Move Over, Mrs Markham - Linda Lodge
2019: Run for Your Wife - Barbara Smith 
2021: Women of Pensionable Rage - Linda Godfrey/Julie Tate/Miriam McKenzie

References

External links 
 
Judy Buxton Website: www.judybuxton.co.uk

1949 births
Living people
People from Croydon
People educated at Croydon High School
English stage actresses
English television actresses
Royal Shakespeare Company members
Alumni of Rose Bruford College